Super Street Fighter IV: 3D Edition is a fighting video game developed and published by Capcom for the Nintendo 3DS handheld game console. It was released as a launch game in all continents, but in Japan first on 26 February 2011. It is a port of the console game Super Street Fighter IV. The game has sold 1.3 million units worldwide for 3DS.

Gameplay

Super Street Fighter IV 3D Edition plays much like the console version, Super Street Fighter IV. It plays like a traditional fighting game, utilizing 3D backgrounds and 3D characters on a 2D plane. It has two primary modes: single-player and multi-player, the latter mode which supports both online and local play. Other modes include Team Battle, which supports up to eight players; Replay Channel, which allows players to view and share replays with others online; and rival battles, which features a dialogue sequence between two characters which depends on who they are. The battles take place between two opponents, of whom each have their own health meter that the opponent has to deplete by attacking each other. Players win a match by either depleting the opponent's health or merely having more health after the time runs out. The objective is to win two times in a match. If the opponents are on equal standing when the timer runs out, it is considered a loss for both opponents; if this occurs twice in one match, it results in a draw.

Players use the Nintendo 3DS' circle pad or directional pad to control their fighters, which allows players to jump, crouch, and move toward and away from opponents. Players use the face buttons in order to performs techniques such as punches, kicks, grabs, and "personal actions." The touchscreen can also be used to use these personal actions, which displays multiple icons for each action, though its nature depends on whether players have the difficult mode set on "Lite" or "Pro"; on Pro mode, such moves have to be performed manually. Players may filter online play opponents; this depends on whether they are playing in Lite or Pro modes. It features abilities such as "Focus Attacks" and separate meters for both "Super" and "Ultra" combos. When in the single-player mode, if toggled on, there are additional "bonus stages" which allows a chance to receive additional points, similar to the ones found in Street Fighter II. The first challenge challenges players to break a car while the second has players break as many barrels as they can. Super Street Fighter IV 3D Edition features all 35 characters found in the home console version of Super Street Fighter IV. Each character has multiple unique costumes, some of which originally appeared as downloadable content in the console version, that are included on the Nintendo 3DS game card.

3D Edition introduces a number of new features. One of the more prominent features is the use of stereoscopic 3D, as well as the support of the Nintendo Network, for which it uses the Nintendo 3DS's universal Friend Code to play online. As stated above, it utilizes the touchscreen to allow players to perform special abilities more easily, as well as the difficulty modes Lite and Pro. 3D Edition makes use of the 3DS's StreetPass function, which allows players to swap in-game figurines of characters that are unlocked throughout the game as well as use them in battle whenever the 3DS is in range of another player's 3DS who also has the game. The figurines have statistics, and players can make their own team of figurines for the aforementioned figurine battles. Players are also able to share the game with others, who can play it without a copy of the game; however, players are only allowed to use Ryu in a single specific stage (Training Stage). Players are also able to switch the view from the traditional 2D plane to an over-the-shoulder view, called Dynamic Mode, which presents the stereoscopic 3D better.

Development

Super Street Fighter IV 3D Edition was developed by Capcom and Dimps and published by Capcom and Nintendo Australia for the Nintendo 3DS handheld game console. It was first released in Japan on 26 February 2011, and was slated to be released on March 25, 27, and 31, 2011, in Europe, North America, and Australia, respectively. It is a port of the PlayStation 3 and Xbox 360 video game Super Street Fighter IV. It was first announced at E3 2010, where features such as stereoscopic 3D and Wi-Fi support were revealed. Developer Yoshinori Ono stated that it would be identical in terms of gameplay to the console version. In an interview conducted with Famitsu between it and Ono, Famitsu stated that all 35 characters from the console version would be included. It has been featured at other events; this includes the "Marvel vs. Capcom 3 Fight Club" event, the GDC 2011 event, and the PAX 2011 event.

Before 3D Edition began development, a port of Super Street Fighter IV was considered for either the Nintendo DS or PlayStation Portable; however, Ono felt that neither handheld would provide satisfaction for him. He was first introduced to the 3DS by Capcom producer Jun Takeuchi, who showed him a version of Resident Evil 5 playing on the 3DS. Afterward, he "threw together a quick build" of Super Street Fighter IV in a couple weeks for the 3DS. Nintendo, after being shown the build, was impressed by it, and wanted it to be shown at E3 2010. However, Ono felt that the build was not ready to be shown; instead, he allowed Nintendo to show a couple of screenshots and talk about the game. Ono included the Dynamic Mode early on in development in part to make it appealing to casual gamers. He noted another advantage of this angle was how well it worked with Ken and Ryu, who he finds to be most commonly used by "lapsed players" who used to play the series. In an interview between Nintendo president Satoru Iwata and Yoshinori Ono, the two of them discussed the touchscreen control, with the latter comparing it to New Super Mario Bros. Wiis Super Guide function. Ono added that they were intent on making a game that could make it more approachable. He added that while some may call him a "sell-out", he felt that it was advantageous to the developer as well as the gamers. When Ono learned of the pedometer function of the 3DS that rewarded coins for the number of steps taken, he decided to implement it to allow coins to be spent on figurines. He also designed the Fighter Request function, which when activated allows anyone playing the game nearby to accept this request, with the hopes of creating another community.

He noted that the only misgiving he had was with the expressions of characters as they perform or get hit by ultra moves which were accomplished by a different method than the console version; however, he felt that no one would notice this on a small screen. This fact allowed them to make more simplified modes to make the game move faster. The developers also had to tweak the backgrounds as they work on the 3D effects due to them sometimes overlapping with itself. When asked why characters exclusive to the arcade game Super Street Fighter IV Arcade Edition were not featured in the game, Ono explained that it was due to timing and a desire to focus on the already proven console version. He did note however that features from the Arcade Edition could be included if there appears to be interest. He elaborated that even if he could add these features, they may not due to the more hardcore nature of the Arcade Edition, and that if there is no hardcore audience for 3D Edition, they don't want to "force them into some new version." In an attempt to simulate the "Saturn-style" six button configuration, the Pro mode was designed to have these six buttons on the touch screen; however, the developers found it to not be comfortable.

Reception

Pre-release
G4TV's Harold Goldberg praised the Dynamic Mode for its "illusion of depth", the usefulness of the touchscreen features, and the StreetPass support. However, he did note that some may consider 3D unnecessary for a fighting game due to the fast-pace of the gameplay. Fellow G4TV editor Kevin Kelly called it fun and looks great; however, he elaborated that the latter is only true in 2D and that the 3D was distracting. He adds that when the 3D is turned off, the game moves at a higher rate of frames per second. USA Today's Brett Molina described it as a good demonstration of the quality of the 3DS's circle pad. He commented that it was better than the touchscreen and was better than no thumb stick at all. MSNBC's Winda Benedetti praised its 3D for how it "jumps right off the screen in all its butt-kicking glory." IGN's Charles Onyett found that the touchscreen implementation was useful for casual fans, and emulated the console version well, both in terms of faithfulness and visuals. Mercury News' Gieson Cacho found the adaptation to be quality, though noted that he was most excited for the StreetPass function. Toronto Suns Steve Tilley described its visuals as "superb" and praised its StreetPass and touchscreen support.

Jason Schreier praised the Dynamic Mode for its emphasis on 3D and its presentation of "gorgeous-looking brawls". Video Gamer's Neon Kelly noted that while it is very similar to the console version, it appeals well to casual gamers. He adds that the level of effort put in from Capcom encouraged him that the title would be good. GamePros Dave Rudden wrote that he had a "good feeling" about the game, a feeling that he held with Street Fighter II on the Super NES. The portability and 3D effects are enough for him to overlook the lack of support of a proper arcade stick. GameSpot's Brendan Sinclair in early impressions of the 3DS thought that the circle pad might be difficult to use in 3D Edition. However, Kotaku's Stephen Totilo praised the circle pad; while he writes that he "stink[s] at Street Fighter", the circle pad allows him to "effortlessly" perform "quarter-circle turns". Fellow Kotaku editor Brian Crecente had similar sentiments, where he praised it for how easy it is.

IGN's Richard George ranked it the second best Nintendo 3DS game at the time of the article's posting; he wrote that it might be "Nintendo's best asset in selling its new system." Fellow IGN editor Lucas M. Thomas mentioned 3D Edition in his article on the "port problem" of the 3DS, where he wrote he had already "been there". Wireds Andy Robertson described it as "testament to the visual horsepower" of the 3DS as well as "one of the more surprising titles in the lineup." GamesRadar's Justin Towell noted that while it looks good, this was due in part to one-on-one fighting games allowing developers to get the most out of a platform. Fellow GamesRadar editor Brett Elston also found it aesthetically pleasing, but felt that it could go without the 3D effects. However, Andriasang's Anoop Gantayat felt that it was one of the best demonstration of 3D effects on the 3DS. Ars Technica's Casey Johnson also felt that it made good use of the 3D effects along with some of the other 3DS's features.

Post-release

It received positive reception upon release; it holds an aggregate score of 85/100 at Metacritic. Computer and Video Games Tamoor Hussain called the console version "this generation's greatest fighter" and praised the 3D effects, the amount of content retained from the console version, and its increased appeal to both casual and hardcore gamers. Fellow CVG editor Andy Robinson recommended it as one of the better launch games. Famitsu editors found it to be well received, giving praise to the graphics and touchscreen control though noting that the Dynamic Mode can be a "bit hard to see." Eurogamer Johnny Minkley noted that while it was not a "serious alternative for high-level players", it gets as close to it as it can. He also gave praise to its figurines and the Dynamic Mode. Kotaku Brian Ashcraft named it the one game to buy around the 3DS's launch, and praised it as demonstrative of what the 3DS can do. He was surprised by the quality of the online play; while he expected it to be as bad as Super Smash Bros. Brawl, he found it "lag-free, smooth and painless." He also gives praise to the StreetPass function and touchscreen control, though he notes that he has not actually been able to use StreetPass yet. Stuff James Burnett found it to be a strong launch title due to its "fun, fast and tight" gameplay, sound design, and the online multiplayer.

GameSpot Ricardo Torres and Shaun McInnis featured it in their analysis of the Japanese 3DS launch. They wrote that it is "one of the highest profile titles available" for the 3DS and made a good transition from consoles. They also called the touchscreen controls reliable and not disruptive. NGamer UK noted that while it was a "staggering port of an exceptional fighting game", it was not the "definitive version of the game". Game Informer called it a "complete game" and that Super Street Fighter IV is "one of the best fighting games around". Pocket Gamer Damien McFerran noted that while the "one-on-one 2D fighter" was not the ideal game to demonstrate stereoscopic visuals, 3D Edition proved to be the most appealing game at the 3DS's launch. He noted that despite some "minor interface issues", it is also "one of the finest portable punch-ups we’ve experienced in years". The Telegraph Tom Hoggins wrote that while not the definitive version of Super Street Fighter IV and was "yet another update of a two year old game", it was "built with such skill and pride it's hard not to fall for it all over again." In a comparison of its video game Dead or Alive: Dimensions to 3D Edition, Team Ninja's Yosuke Hayashi stated that Dimensions, due to its 3D gameplay, conveyed the 3D effects better than 3D Edition 2D visuals do. In spite of the positive reception, games(TM) found that even though it was "arguably the best portable version" of a Street Fighter game, this was due to the poor quality of previous games of its kind rather than the high quality of it. GamePros Julian Rignall meanwhile found it to be "everything you could want from a mobile Super Street Fighter IV".

Sales and promotion
In its first week of release, 3D Edition was the seventh best-selling video game and sold 44,649 copies in Japan. It fell to be the 11th best-selling game of the following week, selling 16,974 with a total of 61,624 copies sold. It ranked 18 in the following week. Super Street Fighter IV 3D Edition ranked among other 3DS games in Amazon UK's top 20 "Hot Future Releases" list. It also ranked 58th on Amazon Japan's best-selling games list in one instance. 3D Edition and Pilotwings Resort were the two best-selling titles in the United States and United Kingdom. Metro, in collaboration with Nintendo, gave away 10 copies of the game. Nintendo also hired two actors to play the roles of Ryu and Ken to fight each other to promote 3D Edition, although the announcer's voices are ripped from the game, one of the examples was "It's the battle of the century!". 3D Edition'' became the first Nintendo 3DS title to ship 1 million copies worldwide.

References

External links

2011 video games
Dimps games
Multiplayer and single-player video games
Nintendo 3DS eShop games
Nintendo 3DS games
Nintendo 3DS-only games
Nintendo Network games
Street Fighter games
Video game remakes
Video game sequels
Video games developed in Japan
Video games with 2.5D graphics
Video games with cel-shaded animation